Wahengbam Angousana Luwang (born 2 February 1996) is an Indian professional footballer who plays as a midfielder for East Bengal in the Indian Super League.

Career
Born in Imphal, Wahengbam Luwang began his professional career playing for the TRAU F.C. in 2017–18 I-League 2nd Division. He joined TRAU from Shillong Lajong academy and made his professional I-League debut on 1 December 2019 against Chennai City in a 1–0 defeat away from home, where he played as a left-back.

East Bengal
In 2020, Angousana signed for Kolkata giants SC East Bengal and was announced to be a part of their squad in the 2020–21 Indian Super League.

Career statistics

Club

References

External links
 

1996 births
Living people
People from Imphal
Indian footballers
TRAU FC players
East Bengal Club players
Association football midfielders
Footballers from Manipur
I-League players
Indian Super League players